Dr. Pullella Sriramachandrudu (24 October 1927 – 24 June 2015) was an Indian scholar of Vedanta, Vyakarana and Alankara Sastra and a prolific writer of Sanskrit and Telugu literature. He was widely credited with several books in Sanskrit and Telugu and was best known for translating many difficult Sanskrit works into Telugu the seven volume Telugu edition of the Indian epic, Ramayanam by Valmiki. The Government of India has honored Pullella Srirama Chandrudu in 2011, with the fourth highest civilian award of Padma Shri.

Early life 
Pullela Sriramachandrudu was born in Indupalli Village, Ayinavolu Mandal of East Godavari District on 24 October 1927. His parents were Sri. Pullela Satyanarayana Sastry and Smt. Satyavati. Their family then moved to the nearby village of Ayinavilli.

Education 
Pullela Sriramachandrudu studies Panchakavyas, Sriharsha's Naishadam, Murari Anargharaghavam and Siddhantakaumudi under his father. He later joined the Sanskrit college at Narendrapuram and studied the classics like Kirataarjuneeyam and other grammatical works under the tutelage of Sri. Kompella Subbaraya Sastry. Later he moved to the Madras Mylapore Sanskrit college where he graduated as 'Vedanta Siromani'. While he was studying in the Madras college, he learnt to communicate in English with the help of a friend V. Venkatachalam. Also he passed the 'Hindi Visharada' examination from the Hindi Prachar Sabha.

In 1948, he found a job as Hindi Pandit in Malikipuram. But his appetite for learning had not been satisfied and while he was teaching Pullela Sriramachandrudu he also passed out of the Matriculation examination in 1950. He later went on to complete the 'Telugu Vidwan' examination in 1952, Intermediate in 1953 and in 1955 he finished the Bachelor of Arts. Then, he enrolled in the famous Banaras Hindu University for Masters majoring in Sanskrit grammar (Metaphors and Allegories) and also another Masters in English and passed out in 1957 and 1961 respectively. In 1963, he again passed out of Masters in Hindi from the same university.

Now having mastered Sanskrit, Hindi, Telugu and English, he presented a thesis on "Contributions of Panditaraja Jagannatha to Sanskrit poetics" to Osmania University in Hyderabad under the supervision of Dr. Aryendra Sharma for which he was awarded a doctors.

Marriage 
As was the custom in those days, Sriramachandrudu was married to Smt. Subbalakshmi who was the daughter of Sri. Mangipudi Venkata Sastry at an early age of 14 years. His wife was 8 at the time of their marriage.

Career 
Sriramachandrudu's first job was as a Hindi Pandit in Malikipuram High School. In 1951, he joined the K.B.R. College in Amalapuram as a Sanskrit Pandit and in 1957 he was made a Sanskrit lecturer. From 1960 to 1965, he worked as a Sanskrit lecturer in Warangal college and in 1965 he was transferred to Osmania University's college of arts. in 1976, he was also the director of Sri Venkateshwara Oriental Research Institute in Tirupati for a period of about 4 months. Later he returned to Osmania University and continued as a reader and after a promotion to the grade of Professor, he managed the Sanskrit Department. He also worked as the director of Sanskrit Academy for about 11 years and as a Secretary and Vice-President of Surabharati Association.

Selected bibliography 
The Chronological list of his works is:

Collections / Edited works

Books inspired / commissioned / edited / facilitated 
From 1971, he edited most of the nearly 30 works of Appaya Dikshita published by the Srimad Appaya Deekshitendra Granthavali Prakasana Samithi – of which he was a Vice President.
During the 1980s, he as Secretary was instrumental in the publication of more than a score of works by Sura Bharati Samiti. 
In 2004, the Saṃskṛta Bhāṣā Pracāra Samiti brought out 25 monographs in Telugu to commemorate its silver jubilee. Eight of these (included in the above list) were authored by Prof. Pullela Sriramachandrudu, who conceptualized, commissioned and edited the entire series.

References

Further reading
 
Jonnalagadda Srinivasa Rao, K. Aravinda Rao (Editors). Amṛtotsava Volume of Prof. P. Sriramachandrudu. Hyderabad: Janaśrī. 2003. A Festschrift in 200 pages with articles in Telugu, English and Sanskrit. Includes a list of 121 books.
P. Shashirekha (Ed.). Sri Ramachandra Pratibha: Contribution of Mahamahopadhyaya Prof. P. Sri Ramachandrudu to Sanskrit Literature. Hyderabad: Jayalakshmi Publications. 2008. 492 pages. Contains 38 papers in English and Sanskrit presented during an eponymous National Seminar held at Arts College, Osmania University on 15, 16 and 17 November 2007. Includes a list of 130 books.
Aruna Vyas. Padmaśrī Puraskṛta Pullela Śrīrāmacadruu: Saṃskṛtavijñānakhani – Vedāntavicāradhuni. Hyderabad: Jayalakshmi Publications. 2013. xxiv + 191 pages. Includes a list of 149 books.

1927 births
2015 deaths
People from East Godavari district
Telugu-language writers
Sanskrit writers
Scholars from Andhra Pradesh
Indian Sanskrit scholars
20th-century Indian historians
Recipients of the Sahitya Akademi Award in Sanskrit
Recipients of the Padma Shri in literature & education
Recipients of the Sahitya Akademi Prize for Translation